Cadiorapa is a genus of moths of the family Noctuidae. The genus was described by Nye in 1975.

Species
Cadiorapa albivena (Hampson, 1910) Chile
Cadiorapa globifrons (Dyar, 1920) Mexico
Cadiorapa praxina (Schaus, 1905) Brazil (Paraná)
Cadiorapa puella (Schaus, 1904) Brazil (São Paulo)

References

Acontiinae